Timiskaming is a word from the Algonquin Temikami or Temikaming, from tim meaning "deep" and kami meaning "open waters". Alternate spellings include Temiskaming, Témiscaming and Témiscamingue. The word Temagami comes from the same root.

Controversy exists over the spelling of this word.  A movement to change the spelling of the District of Timiskaming to Temiskaming (an e instead of an i) cites a typographical error by a government official, but the act of parliament that led to the name change granted this official authority to correct the spelling.  What he considered to be a spelling correction, some people today call a spelling mistake.

The spelling controversy goes back to the 18th century.  English maps from that century show the spelling of the lake as Temiscamin, Temescaming, Temiscaming, Timiscaming, and Temiscamino, with Temiscaming being the most common.  Spelling of the name of the aboriginal tribe presented even more alternatives.  In all cases, though, there is no k.  The 21st Century has inherited a debate from the 18th Century.

It refers to the following places, all in Canada:
 Lake Timiskaming (in French: Lac Témiscamingue)
 Nipissing—Timiskaming, a federal riding in the province of Ontario
 Timiskaming—Cochrane (provincial electoral district), a provincial riding of Ontario
 Timiskaming District, a census division of Ontario
 Temiskaming Shores, city in the Timiskaming District
 Unorganized East Timiskaming District, an unorganized territory in the Timiskaming District
 Unorganized West Timiskaming District, an unorganized territory in the Timiskaming District
 Abitibi—Témiscamingue, a federal electoral district in Quebec
 Rouyn-Noranda–Témiscamingue, a provincial electoral district in Quebec
 Abitibi-Témiscamingue, a region located in western Quebec
 Témiscamingue Regional County Municipality, Quebec, a regional county municipality RCM in Abitibi-Témiscamingue
 Timiskaming, Quebec, a First Nation reserve in Témiscamingue RCM
 Témiscaming, a city in Témiscamingue RCM
 Les Lacs-du-Témiscamingue, Quebec, an unorganized territory in Témiscamingue RCM
 Fort Témiscamingue, a former trading post and National Historic Site near Ville-Marie

The name was also used in several abolished federal and provincial ridings:
 Timiskaming (provincial electoral district)
 Timiskaming (electoral district) (federal)
 Timiskaming—Cochrane (federal)
 Timiskaming—French River (federal)
 Timiskaming North (federal)
 Timiskaming South (federal)
 Témiscamingue (electoral district) (federal)
 Témiscamingue (provincial electoral district)

References 

Algonquian languages
Place name etymologies
Names of places in Canada
Geography of Abitibi-Témiscamingue
Geography of Timiskaming District